Governors Village may refer to a location in the United States:

 Governors Village, California
 Governors Village, North Carolina